Promise is a 1986 American drama television film directed by Glenn Jordan and written by Richard Friedenberg, from a story by Kenneth Blackwell, Tennyson Flowers and Friedenberg. James Garner stars as a care-free man who returns to his hometown after his mother's death, and has to assume responsibility for his mentally ill younger brother (James Woods). The film aired on CBS on December 14, 1986, as a Hallmark Hall of Fame presentation. One of the most honored films in television history, Promise received the Peabody Award, Humanitas Prize, Christopher Award, and Golden Globe Award. Its record of five Primetime Emmy Awards was not matched until 2010, by the film Temple Grandin.

Plot
When his mother dies, estranged son Bob inherits her estate, and, surprisingly, custody of his younger brother D.J., who suffers from schizophrenia. Bob is initially reluctant at his new responsibility, but remembers that he had promised his mother to look after his brother.

Cast
The cast and credits of Promise are recorded at WorldCat.
 James Garner as Bob Beuhler
 James Woods as D.J.
 Piper Laurie as Annie Gilbert
 Peter Michael Goetz as Stuart
 Michael Alldredge as Gibb
 Alan Rosenberg as Dr. Pressman
 Mary Marsh as Mrs. Post
 Barbara Niven as Joan   (credited as Barbara Lee Alexander)
 Steven M. Gagnon as Michael
 Raissa Fleming as Lonnie
 Art Burke as Dr. Wexler
 Bob Griggs as Minister
 Janet Baumhover as Mrs. Green
 Charles W. Bernard as Mr. Allison
 Claretta Mariana as Beth
 Virginia Settle as Mrs. Burden
 Diana Van Arnam as Netta

Production
Promise was first broadcast December 14, 1986, as part of the Hallmark Hall of Fame television anthology series. Directed by Glenn Jordan from a screenplay by Richard Friedenberg, the film was shot September–October 1986 on location in Oregon, in Corvallis, Salem and Dallas, and at Triangle Lake.

"It was an easy decision for me and my producing partner, Peter Duchow, to join forces with Hallmark," James Garner wrote in his 2011 autobiography, The Garner Files. He felt he would not have been able to play the role of Bob Beuhler five years earlier, since he felt it was unsympathetic. "Not that Bob is a villain, he just never grew up," Garner wrote. James Woods was cast as his younger brother, D.J.; Garner remembered him from the first episode of The Rockford Files.

Woods has said, "People ask me, 'What's the favorite thing you've ever done in your life?' and I always say Promise because it was a perfect part for me and a perfect experience with Jim." He researched his role at a halfway house in Santa Monica, California, where he met a young man whose eloquent description of living with schizophrenia was put into the script:

It's like, all the electric wires in the house are plugged into my brain. And every one has a different noise, so I can't think. Some of the wires have voices in them and they tell me things like what to do and that people are watching me. I know there really aren't any voices, but I feel that there are, and that I should listen to them or something will happen. … I can remember what I was like before. I was a class officer, I had friends. I was going to be an aeronautical engineer. Do you remember, Bobby? I've never had a job. I've never owned a car. I've never lived alone. I've never made love to a woman. And I never will. That's what it's like. You should know. That's why I'm a Hindu. Because maybe it's true: Maybe people are born again. And if there is a God, maybe he'll give me another chance. I believe that, because this can't be all I get.

"Accepting the Emmy for Best Teleplay, Richard Friedenberg said he hoped the film would help schizophrenics by calling attention to their plight," Garner wrote. "I'm sorry to say that 25 years later, schizophrenia is the worst mental health problem facing the nation."

Awards and nominations
 Awards
 1987 Peabody Award — CBS Entertainment, Garner-Duchow Productions
 1987 Emmy Award for Outstanding Drama/Comedy Special
 1987 Emmy Award for Directing in a Miniseries or a Special — Glenn Jordan
 1987 Emmy Award for Outstanding Lead Actor in a Miniseries or a Special — James Woods
 1987 Emmy Award for Outstanding Supporting Actress in a Miniseries or a Special — Piper Laurie
 1987 Emmy Award for Outstanding Writing in a Miniseries or a Special — Richard Friedenberg
 1987 Golden Globe Award for Mini-Series or Motion Picture Made for TV
 1987 Golden Globe Award for Lead Actor — James Woods
 1987 Humanitas Prize — Richard Friedenberg
 Christopher Award

 Nominations
 1987 Emmy Award for Outstanding Cinematography for a Miniseries or a Special — Gayne Rescher
 1987 Emmy Award for Outstanding Lead Actor in a Miniseries or a Special — James Garner
 1987 Golden Globe Award for Lead Actor — James Garner
 1987 Golden Globe Award for Supporting Actress — Piper Laurie

Home media
 2009: Hallmark Hall of Fame, Gold Crown Collector's Edition (DVD), 2009. Special features include a featurette on the making of the film, interviews, cast biographies and credits. Close captioned.
 2012: Warner Archive (DVD-R, created on demand), August 28, 2012.

References

External links
 

1986 television films
1986 films
1986 drama films
1980s American films
1980s English-language films
American drama television films
Best Miniseries or Television Movie Golden Globe winners
CBS network films
Films about brothers
Films about schizophrenia
Films directed by Glenn Jordan
Films scored by David Shire
Films shot in Oregon
Hallmark Hall of Fame episodes
Peabody Award-winning broadcasts
Primetime Emmy Award for Outstanding Made for Television Movie winners